Ivan Lazarenko may refer to:

General Ivan Sidorovich Lazarenko (1895–1944), Soviet military commander
Ivan Lazarenko (politician), vice-chairman of Dnepropetrovsk Oblast council, see Hromada (political party)